Asaph Alexander Ward is an American gospel music record producer.

Background
Ward came to the forefront of the gospel music industry as producer of the groundbreaking 1998 album Everlasting Life for gospel jazz singer Kim Burrell. Since then, Ward has also produced the self-titled debut of Dorinda Clark Cole, as well as the recent 2004 release from Twinkie Clark, Home Once Again: Live in Detroit. Ward also produced 2 tracks on Smokie Norful's 2004 Grammy-winning nothing without You album. Asaph's wife Miranda co-writes and collaborates on many of the projects for their joint company Miralex Entertainment.

Production credits

 Mary J. Blige: "The First Noel (feat. The Clark Sisters)" (Verve, 2013)
 Kim Burrell: The Love Album (Shanachie, 2011)
 The Clark Sisters: A Clark Family Christmas  (Karew Records, 2009)
 Coko: "Endow Me (featuring Fantasia, Faith Evans, and Lil' Mo)" (Light/Artemis, 2006)
 Kim Burrell: Everlasting Life (Tommy Boy Gospel, 1998)
 Twinkie Clark: Home Once Again: Live In Detroit (Verity, 2004)
 Brent Jones: "Spiritual Things", "Holy Ghost High", "Midnite" (EMI Gospel)
 Londa Larmond: Love Letters (EMI Gospel)
 Smokie Norful: "I Know The Lord Will Make A Way" and "Continuous Grace" (EMI Gospel, 2004)
 Joann Rosario: Now More Than Ever... Worship (F. Hammond Music/Verity)
 Virtue: "Everything Will Be Alright" (Verity)
 Crystal Aikin: Crystal Aikin (Verity)
 Larry Callahan & Selected of God: The Evolution II (Sing 2 Praise, 2012)

References

American male songwriters
African-American songwriters
Living people
American record producers
Year of birth missing (living people)
21st-century African-American people